Tai Po Kau is an area and a village south of the town of Tai Po in Hong Kong, which was the site of the former Tai Po Kau station on the Kowloon–Canton Railway. It is located at a river estuary that empties into Tolo Harbour.

Administration
Tai Po Kau is a recognized village under the New Territories Small House Policy.

See also
 Ha Wong Yi Au
 Mang Gui Kiu
 Museum of Ethnology (Hong Kong)
 Tai Po Kau Nature Reserve
 Tai Po Lookout

References

External links

 Delineation of area of existing village Tai Po Kau (Tai Po) for election of resident representative (2019 to 2022)

Tai Po
Places in Hong Kong